The Bend Motorsport Park is a  bitumen motor racing circuit at Tailem Bend, South Australia, Australia, about  south-east of the state capital, Adelaide.

The complex has a bitumen circuit, drag racing strip, and drift racing circuit.

The race circuits are of a high international standard and licensed by the Fédération Internationale de l'Automobile (FIA) for car racing and the Fédération Internationale de Motocyclisme (FIM) for motorcycle racing.

History

In February 2015, Peregrine Corporation lodged plans with the Government of South Australia to redevelop the former Mitsubishi Motors Australia test track at Tailem Bend, South Australia. Approval was granted in May 2015 with construction commencing in March 2016. Initially titled the South Australian Motorsport Park, by the time construction commenced, The Bend Motorsport Park name had been adopted.

The address of the site was originally in Elwomple. In September 2017, before the facility opened, the boundary between Tailem Bend and Elwomple was adjusted so that The Bend Motorsport Park is officially in Tailem Bend, not Elwomple.

The first major event was the Revolve24 Endurance Cycling Challenge on 13–14 January 2018, an ultra-distance cycling festival featuring 24-hour, 12-hour and 6-hour races. It hosted The Bend SuperSprint, a round of the 2018 Supercars Championship, in August 2018. It has a desire to hold a MotoGP Australian Motorcycle Grand Prix round.

On 4–14 January 2019, the circuit hosted the 25th Australian Scout Jamboree. From January 10–12, 2020 it hosted a round of the 2019–20 Asian Le Mans Series season as the 4 Hours of The Bend and the Supercars sprint round will be replaced by a new endurance event, The Bend 500. The Supercars race was later dropped from the calendar altogether, in a shortened calendar due to the COVID-19 pandemic, with circuit managing director Sam Shahin openly critical of the cancellation.

Sam Shahin also offered up the facility for Hotel Quarantine during the Covid pandemic, but this was not taken up by the South Australian Government.

Facilities

International Circuit
Length: 
Used for majority of events including Supercars, Superbikes and national series events, through to state racing, club racing and track hire

GT Circuit
Length: 
Used for endurance racing, specialist racing events, private hire and test days. Hosted a four-hour Asian Le Mans Series event in January 2020.

West Circuit

Length: 
Used for the majority of short track events. Includes club racing, testing, sprint events, “cruising” events, driver/rider training
Used for 2020 OTR SuperSprint The Bend event in 2020 Supercars Championship
Can be used independently from the East Circuit

East Circuit
Length: 
Used for driver/rider training, drifting, testing, club days, private days
Can be used independently from the West Circuit

Pit building and hotel
There are 34 pit garages.
The 100 room Rydges Pit Lane Hotel opened in 2019.

Lap records

The fastest official race lap records at The Bend Motorsport Park are listed as:

Notes

References

Motorsport venues in South Australia
Supercars Championship circuits
2018 establishments in Australia